Piz Urlaun is a mountain of the Glarus Alps, located on the border between the Swiss cantons of Glarus and Graubünden. It lies on the ridge between the Tödi and the Bifertenstock. Both sides are covered by glaciers.

References

External links
Piz Urlaun on Summitpost
Piz Urlaun on Hikr

Mountains of the Alps
Alpine three-thousanders
Mountains of Switzerland
Mountains of the canton of Glarus
Mountains of Graubünden
Glarus–Graubünden border
Sumvitg